Ozark Air Lines Flight 809 was a regularly scheduled flight from Nashville, Tennessee, to St. Louis, Missouri, with four intermediate stops. On July 23, 1973, while landing at St. Louis International Airport, it crashed, killing 38 of the 44 persons aboard. A severe downdraft, associated with a nearby thunderstorm, was cited as the cause.

Synopsis

On July 23, 1973, Ozark Air Lines Flight 809 was operated by one of the companys Fairchild-Hiller FH-227s, registration N4215.   The flight was scheduled to go from Nashville, Tennessee, to St. Louis, Missouri, with four intermediate stops at Clarksville, Tennessee; Paducah, Kentucky; Cape Girardeau, Missouri; and Marion, Illinois. The segments to Clarksville, Paducah, Cape Girardeau, and Marion proceeded normally.

While the weather was clear at the flights stops, several persons who boarded family or friends on the flight at Marion reported that the sky "didnt look good". The flight departed Marion at 1705 en route to St. Louis.

At 1726 the flight arrived in the vicinity of St. Louis.   Visibility in the area was reported as hazy. The flight continued on, and soon after reported an inoperative fuel pump to company maintenance.

At 1732 the flight entered an area of thunderstorm cells around St. Louis International Airport. The pilot told the passengers they were approaching turbulence.  At 1742 the controller at St. Louis reported to Flight 809 that thunderstorms were passing south of the runway, directly in Flight 809's path.  This was the last transmission to the flight. The aircraft crashed 2 miles (3.2 km) short of the runway, in a wooded ravine next to a residential area in Normandy, Missouri, near the University of Missouri-St. Louis.  There were reports of a tornado near Ladue, Missouri near the time of the accident but the Weather Service did not confirm it.

Investigation

The flight had crashed directly in the approach path to St. Louis International Airport.  It had descended below the glide slope, crashing short of the runway.  Witnesses in the area saw the flight "suddenly ascend to 400  or 500 feet" (between 122 and 152 m), "and then rapidly descend to 200 feet" (61 m), following which it was struck by lightning.  The aircraft was reported to have performed several "evasive maneuvers", and then crashed into the trees.  All witnesses reported heavy rain at the time of the accident.

A Trans World Airlines flight landing just before Flight 809 reported getting caught in a strong updraft, and was forced to execute a missed approach, rather than land.

The captain and first officer both survived the accident.  While the first officer could not remember anything about the incident, the captain did report hail hitting the airplane, pulling the control stick, and seeing fire after impact.

The aircraft was broken in several pieces after impact; the cockpit area was clear of the main wreckage. Four passengers were thrown clear at impact; all survived. The remainder of the fuselage was broken open; all in this area were killed upon impact.

No mechanical defects, other than the inoperative fuel pump, were reported. The aircraft was found to be in a high nose-up attitude at impact.

The approach controller vectored Flight 809 into Runway 30L at St. Louis. Although the flight crew knew thunderstorms were in the vicinity of the airport, the controllers lack of urgency seemed to lead the flight crew to believe they could land ahead of the storms.

In coming through the storm, the high winds in the storm cell lead investigators to believe that a strong downdraft pushed the plane below the glide slope.  The crew's evasive actions were not sufficient to prevent the plane from striking the ground.

The investigators main questions were why the controller had not indicated the severity of the storm to the flight, and, when the flight knew of the storms, why they had not requested a different path to the airport to avoid the storm.

Cause

The National Transportation Safety Board concluded that the crash was caused by the aircraft encountering a severe downdraft on approach, and the captains decision to continue the flight into a known severe storm area. The captains decision was influenced by the lack of a timely warning about the storm by the weather service and the improper assessment of conditions by the dispatcher.

See also
 List of accidents and incidents involving commercial aircraft
 Microburst

References

Airliner accidents and incidents in Missouri
Airliner accidents and incidents caused by microbursts
Ozark Air Lines accidents and incidents
Aviation accidents and incidents in the United States in 1973
Disasters in Missouri
1973 in Missouri
1973 meteorology
Accidents and incidents involving the Fairchild F-27
History of St. Louis County, Missouri
July 1973 events in the United States
St. Louis Lambert International Airport